This list of the tallest buildings and structures in Liverpool ranks high-rise structures in Liverpool, England, by height (buildings in the wider Liverpool Urban Area are listed separately within the article). The tallest building in Liverpool is currently the 40-storey West Tower, which rises  on Liverpool's waterfront. It is also the tallest habitable building in the United Kingdom outside of London and Manchester. Liverpool is a city undergoing mass regeneration, with older buildings being demolished to make way for new developments.

The history of tall buildings and structures in Liverpool began in 1911, with the completion of the Royal Liver Building. This period marked the pinnacle of Liverpool's economic success, when it regarded itself as the "second city" of the British Empire. In 1965, its 54-year reign as the tallest building in Liverpool came to an end with the completion of the Radio City Tower. At , it originally housed a revolving restaurant and then, since 2000, a radio station. In 2008, the Radio City Tower was topped by Beetham Organization's West Tower. 

A masterplan, envisioned by Peel Holdings, to redevelop Liverpool's north docks, named Liverpool Waters, was launched in 2006 and received Government backing in 2013; it includes proposals for multiple high-rise buildings that will considerably change the city's skyline over the next few decades. The first building of the project began construction in 2018.

However, the 1998 proposal was never built.



Tallest completed buildings and structures

This list ranks completed buildings and structures in Liverpool that are at least 49 m (160 ft) tall; under construction, proposed and cancelled buildings are excluded. Generic structures such as transmitters or wind turbines are also omitted. 

Note this list is not comprehensive, as the heights of a number of candidate structures are unknown. Only those with known heights are included. 

An equal sign (=) following a rank indicates the same height between two or more buildings. Heights are rounded to the nearest whole metre. The "Year" column refers to the year when the building reached its current height; generally this is the year of construction but for some the height was reached following alterations and additions to the existing structure.

Tallest by type

Air traffic control tower: Liverpool John Lennon Airport Control Tower – 
Chimney stack: Royal Liverpool University Hospital Boiler House – 
Church spire: Welsh Presbyterian Church – 
Commercial building: Royal Liver Building – 
Ferris wheel: Wheel of Liverpool – 
Government building: Queen Elizabeth II Law Courts – 
Hospital: Royal Liverpool University Hospital – 
Hotel: Meliã Hotel Liverpool (Metropolitan House; repurposed) – 
Industrial building: Bankfield Grain Silo – 
Monument: Wellington's Column – 
Museum / gallery: Victoria Gallery & Museum – 
Power station: Port of Liverpool wind farm (Canada Dock & Huskisson Dock turbines) – 
Radio mast: Radio City Tower – 
Religious building: Liverpool Cathedral – 
Residential building: West Tower – 
Stadium: Anfield – 
University building: James Parsons Building – 
Ventilation shaft: George's Dock & North John Street Ventilation Stations – 
Water tower: Everton water tower (decommissioned) –

Tallest under construction, approved and proposed
Below are sub-sections for the tallest under construction, approved and proposed buildings and structures in Liverpool. Cancelled projects are not included.

Height figures are rounded to the nearest metre.

Under construction
This lists buildings that are under construction in Liverpool (over 49 m).

Approved
This lists buildings that have been approved for, but are yet to start, construction in Liverpool (over 49 m).

Proposed
This lists buildings that have been proposed but are yet to receive approval to be built in Liverpool (over 49 m).

Liverpool Waters

Liverpool Waters is a large scale, £5.5bn regeneration project of the Vauxhall dockland areas of Liverpool that is currently under development by The Peel Group. A thirty year long project, the development is expected to create 21.5 million sq ft of new commercial and residential floor space and will consist of upwards of seventy buildings, with many classed as high-rise.

The project was revealed publicly in 2007. The plans, submitted to Liverpool City Council in 2010, were approved in 2012; approval was reaffirmed by the UK Government in 2013. Construction of the very first building of the scheme eventually commenced five years later in 2018; completion of the entire project is currently slated for 2041.

The original proposal included a large array of skyscrapers, compared with the likes of New York and Shanghai. However, due to concerns from, primarily, Historic England and UNESCO, regarding the impact of tall buildings to Liverpool's World Heritage Status, the plans have been revised multiple times, resulting in building heights vastly scaled down. Extensive redesigns notwithstanding, the current version of the master-plan still includes several plots of the site reserved for notable high-rises set to transform Liverpool's skyline in the next couple of decades.

Plots poised to be populated by a structure over 100 metres are listed in the table below: (Note the below heights do not refer to that of a currently proposed building. They are the maximum permitted height for any future building designed for that plot, as agreed with planning officers.)

Timeline of tallest buildings and structures
Liverpool's skyline has been built up mostly in the last 20 years. The Royal Liver Building held the title of tallest structure in Liverpool for 54 years until Radio City Tower was completed in 1965. Radio City Tower was finally beaten in 2008 by West Tower.

Tallest buildings in the Liverpool Urban Area

The list below contains the tallest buildings in the Liverpool Urban Area and the Wirral. This term is used by the Office for National Statistics (ONS) to denote the urban area around Liverpool. Structures are not included in the below list although the tallest free-standing structures are the multiple ship-to-shore cranes of the Liverpool2 container port in Seaforth which measure 92m in height and 132m when raised.

Gallery

References

External links
SkyscraperNews: Liverpool

Liverpool
 
Buildings
Tallest